The 1950 Hardin–Simmons Cowboys football team was an American football team that represented Hardin–Simmons University in the Border Conference during the 1950 college football season. In its seventh season under head coach Warren B. Woodson, the team compiled a 5–5 record (3–3 against conference opponents), finished fifth in the conference, and outscored opponents by a total of 278 to 180.

Only one Hardin-Simmons players was named to the 1950 All-Border Conference football team: quarterback John Ford.

Schedule

References

Hardin-Simmons
Hardin–Simmons Cowboys football seasons
Hardin-Simmons Cowboys football